Gladiovalva ignorella is a moth of the family Gelechiidae. It was described by Mark I. Falkovitsh and Oleksiy V. Bidzilya in 2003. It is found in southern Kazakhstan and Uzbekistan.

The larvae feed on Atraphaxis spinosa.

References

Moths described in 2003
Gladiovalva